Taputimu is a village in southwestern Tutuila Island in American Samoa. It is the nearest village to the Fagatele Bay National Marine Sanctuary, although the main access is from the neighboring village of Futiga. It is home to Leala Shoreline National Natural Landmark and Leala Sliding Rock. Leala Sliding Rock is a natural rock formation between Vailoatai and Taputimu, which is a scenic landmark as well as a natural playground or slide. It was created by the ebb and flow of the ocean; the erosion has created a smooth shoreline site. It is located in Tualatai County in the Western District of Tutuila.

Le'ala Shoreline National Natural Landmark is 35 acres and was designated in 1972. Leala Sliding Rock is accessible from Taputimu. Taputimu Tide Pools are located nearby and are accessible for swimming at low tide.

Demographics

From 1980 to 1990, Taputimu's population grew from 434 to 520 persons, which represented an annual growth rate of 1.98%. The proportion of inhabitants who were born abroad nearly tripled between 1985 and 1990. About 105 homes were located in the village in 1995. As of 1995, Taputimu was home to five commercial businesses which included four grocery stores.

References 

Villages in American Samoa
Tutuila